"Never Going Home" is a song by French DJ Kungs. It was released on 21 May 2021 via Island Records from his upcoming second studio album. The song samples the 2019 song "Idol" by Italian producer Mind Enterprises. It reached top 10 in France, Poland, Croatia, Dutch Top 40 and Flanders, and number one in Wallonia.

Music video
The music video was released on 21 May 2021 via YouTube, The video was filmed at Cercle des Nageurs in Marseille, France. It features people from several generations "letting themselves be carried away by the music".

Credits and personnel
Credits adapted from All Music.

 Kungs – producer, composer, primary artist,
 Mike Marsh – mastering engineer
 Martin Picandet – composer, vocal
 Alex Ridha – producer, mixing
 Andrea Tirone – composer

Charts

Weekly charts

Year-end charts

Certifications

Release history

See also
 List of Ultratop 50 number-one singles of 2021

References

2021 singles
2021 songs
Kungs songs
Ultratop 50 Singles (Wallonia) number-one singles
Songs written by Kungs